The 1647 Programme of four 370 ton fourth-rate vessels was approved by Parliament on 9 January 1647. The ships were to carry a minimum of 32 guns in peacetime and 38 guns in wartime. Each vessel would have 11 pairs lower deck gun ports and eventually an equal number on the upper deck with two pairs on the quarterdeck. The vessels would actually have varying number of guns and the dimensional data would vary considerably. Three vessels were ordered in December 1645.

Design and specifications
The construction of the vessels was assigned to Chatham, Woolwich and Deptford dockyards. The ships would be built under the supervision of the master shipwrights of each Dockyard. As with most vessels of this time period only launch years are available. The dimensional data was so varied that it will be listed on the individual vessels along with their gun armament.

Ships of the 1647 Programme Group

Citations

References
 British Warships in the Age of Sail (1603 – 1714), by Rif Winfield, published by Seaforth Publishing, England © Rif Winfield 2009, EPUB , Chapter 4, The Fourth Rates - 'Small Ships', Vessels acquired from 24 March 1603, 1647 Programme
 Ships of the Royal Navy, by J.J. Colledge, revised and updated by Lt-Cdr Ben Warlow and Steve Bush, published by Seaforth Publishing, Barnsley, Great Britain, © the estate of J.J. Colledge, Ben Warlow and Steve Bush 2020, EPUB 

 

Frigates of the Royal Navy
Ships of the Royal Navy